The Women's 25 km competition at the 2019 World Aquatics Championships was held on 19 July 2019.

Results
The race was started at 08:00.

References

Women's 25 km